Koriander may refer to:
 Princess Koriand'r, also known as Starfire, a female character from DC comics, created by Marv Wolfman and George Pérez in 1980
 The German and Dutch name for coriander (Coriandrum sativum)
 Koriander (restaurant), a fine dining restaurant located in Drachten, in the Netherlands